Máximo Reyes (born 8 January 1929, date of death unknown) was a Peruvian sprinter. He competed in the men's 100 metres at the 1948 Summer Olympics.

References

External links
 

1929 births
Year of death missing
Athletes (track and field) at the 1948 Summer Olympics
Peruvian male sprinters
Peruvian male triple jumpers
Olympic athletes of Peru
Place of birth missing (living people)
20th-century Peruvian people